São Vicente de Fora (English: Saint Vincent Outside the Walls) is a former parish (freguesia) in the municipality of Lisbon, Portugal. At the administrative reorganization of Lisbon on 8 December 2012 it became part of the parish São Vicente. It has a total area of 0.31 km2 and total population of 4,267 inhabitants (2001); density: 13,853.9 inhabitants/km2.

Main sites
Monastery of São Vicente de Fora
Church of Santa Engrácia (National Pantheon)

External links
 São Vicente de Fora's parish website

References 

Former parishes of Lisbon